Colin Harris (born 22 February 1961 in Sanquhar) is a Scottish former professional association football player, who played for several clubs, most notably Raith Rovers, Hibernian and Hamilton Academical.

Harris played for Hibs in the 1985 Scottish League Cup Final, but he was not a successful signing for John Blackley. Alex Miller allowed Harris to return to Raith in 1986. He scored 50 goals in 93 league games in his second spell at Raith, before he enjoyed a successful spell with Hamilton. Harris won two Scottish Challenge Cup winners' medals, and he scored the winning goal in one of those finals. Harris was normally played as a striker, but he was also capable of playing in goal, and he did so for Hamilton.

The Sanqhuar born striker spent a season at Palmerston Park for Queen of the South making twenty-eight appearances and nine as a substitute scoring a total of ten goals in the process.

On 9 November 2015, Harris was inducted into the Raith Rovers FC Hall of Fame.

References

External links
 

1961 births
Clydebank F.C. (1965) players
Cowdenbeath F.C. players
Dundee F.C. players
Association football forwards
Hamilton Academical F.C. players
Hibernian F.C. players
Living people
Livingston F.C. players
Footballers from Dumfries and Galloway
Queen of the South F.C. players
Raith Rovers F.C. players
Scottish Football League players
Scottish footballers
People from Sanquhar